Nataliya Mykhailivna Vitrenko (born December 28, 1951) is a pro-Russian Ukrainian politician and scientist.

Presidential candidacy

Born in Kyiv, she was a candidate in the 2004 Ukrainian presidential election, nominated by the Progressive Socialist Party of Ukraine, which she has chaired since 1996. In the 2002 Ukrainian parliamentary election, her party won 3.22% of the votes. She was a presidential candidate in 1999, when she won 11% of the votes to finish in 4th place. In the 2004 elections, however, she finished in fifth place and received less than 5% of the vote.

On October 2, 1999, Vitrenko was attacked and wounded following a campaign rally when two unknown assailants threw two hand grenades at a crowd gathered outside one of her campaign events.

Natalia Vitrenko was again nominated by the Progressive Socialist Party of Ukraine as candidate for the 2010 Ukrainian presidential election but the CECoU (Central Election Commission of Ukraine) refused to register her for failure to pay the required 2.5 million hryvnya nomination deposit. Vitrenko did not agree with the refusal, submitted a complaint to the judge and before his very eyes tore down the Ukrainian constitution as a protest. On November 11, 2009, Vitrenko said: "Ukraine is condemned either to collapse, or to make a revolution. To Ukrainian government, Constitution of Ukraine is nothing but toilet paper."
Vitrenko's 1999 campaign was characterized by The Ukrainian Weekly as "fierce populism, nostalgia for the Soviet era, and strong anti-Western sentiments".

Involvement with Lyndon LaRouche
Andrew Madison, writing in Vremya Novostei, said that Vitrenko's ideological foundations were partially American in origin, because along with the Marxism she was also influenced by the ideas of Lyndon LaRouche. On her political website, Vitrenko says that she has very similar views to LaRouche on the sinister role of the International Monetary Fund and the dollarization of speculative capital, which she says has become a threat to humanity. She attended a conference in 1995 in Germany, organized by Lyndon LaRouche and Helga Zepp-LaRouche, which passed a "Memorandum of humanity" drafted by Vitrenko.

Political positions
Vitrenko is a member of the Eurasian Youth Union, a group led by Russian philosopher Alexandr Dugin.

Personal life
She is a mother of three children. Including Yuriy Vitrenko.

References

External links

Official web site
The Strange Alliance between Ukrainian “Progressive Socialism” and Russian “Neo-Eurasianism”

1951 births
Living people
Politicians from Kyiv
Socialist Party of Ukraine politicians
Progressive Socialist Party of Ukraine politicians
Second convocation members of the Verkhovna Rada
Third convocation members of the Verkhovna Rada
LaRouche movement
Candidates in the 1999 Ukrainian presidential election
Candidates in the 2004 Ukrainian presidential election
Kyiv National Economic University alumni
21st-century Ukrainian women politicians
Anti-Ukrainian sentiment in Ukraine
Ukrainian collaborators with Russia
Women members of the Verkhovna Rada